Thaumatopsyllidae is a family of crustaceans belonging to the order Cyclopoida.

Genera:
 Australopsyllus McKinnon, 1994
 Caribeopsyllus Suárez-Moraless & Castellanos, 1998
 Orientopsyllus Sewell, 1949
 Thaumatopsyllus Sars, 1913
 Thespesiopsyllus Wilson, 1924

References

Cyclopoida